Wolfsbane (Rahne Sinclair) is a fictional superhero appearing in American comic books published by Marvel Comics. The character is commonly associated with the X-Men. A Scottish mutant, Wolfsbane can transform into a wolf or a transitional state somewhere between human and wolf, similar to a werewolf. She honed her powers to shift between human and wolf characteristics but must keep her feral instincts at bay when she does.

She was initially a member of the X-Men's original junior team, The New Mutants. Later on, she joined the Pentagon-sponsored X-Factor and was also associated with the British superhero team Excalibur. She appeared for a time as a teacher at Xavier's Academy in New X-Men. She served as a member of the X-Factor Investigations detective agency, until she joined the new incarnation of X-Force.

Wolfsbane has made minor appearances in animated television, and the character made a live-action cinematic debut in the 2020 film The New Mutants, portrayed by Maisie Williams.

Publication history
Created by the writer Chris Claremont and artist Bob McLeod, Wolfsbane first appeared in The New Mutants (September 1982), part of the line Marvel Graphic Novel. She starred as a founding member of the New Mutants and features nearly in the entire run of The New Mutants volume 1 (1983-1991), her last issue being #97, in which she decides to stay in Genosha at the end of the X-Tinction Agenda crossover. When the original five X-Men left X-Factor to rejoin the X-Men, Wolfsbane was recruited to join when it became a government operation, in issue #71 (1991) and was featured as a team member through issue #111 (1995) before the title was interrupted by The Age of Apocalypse.  Afterward, Wolfsbane left X-Factor to visit her foster mother, Moira MacTaggart and joined Excalibur starting with issue #90 (1995) and appearing through the title's conclusion with issue #125 (1998). She was a supporting character in the short-lived Warlock comic (1991-2000) featuring the Douglock entity, and then sporadically in The New Mutants volume 2 (2004) and New X-Men (2004-2005).  With the relaunch of X-Factor, volume 3 (2006), Wolfsbane once again saw regular publication as a central team member between issues #1 and #28 (2006-2008), after which she was transferred to the secret strike team X-Force, volume 3 (2008). During this run, she became pregnant by the Asgardian Hrimhari, and with X-Force volume 3 #25 (2010), this pregnancy caused her to return to X-Factor, starting with issue #207 (2010). With her return, much of the X-Factor volume 3 run was dedicated to her pregnancy and her son, Tier, and her last significant appearance was X-Factor #258 (2013).

Fictional character biography

Early life
Rahne (pronounced "Rain") is Scottish (born somewhere in Ross and Cromarty), in the north highlands of Ullapool, Scotland. She was delivered by Dr. Moira MacTaggert, who happened to live locally. Rahne's mother, a local sex worker, never got to know her as she died in childbirth the night of her birth. Her father was the local Presbyterian minister, Reverend Craig, who raised Rahne as an orphan without revealing that she was his child from an illicit relationship. When she was revealed as a mutant, Reverend Craig led an angry mob intending to burn her at the stake. Rahne was rescued and later adopted by Moira MacTaggert. Later, when she confronts Reverend Craig as an adult, she learns that Reverend Craig is actually her biological father and that her mother had been a sex worker. She is recruited by Professor X to become a student at his School for Gifted Youngsters and to join the original New Mutants.

New Mutants
Rahne was one of the original New Mutants, who often operated as adventurers when not in school. Although she was a shy, emotionally repressed girl, Rahne managed to build a strong friendship with Danielle Moonstar and harbor a crush on Sam Guthrie. Danielle discovered she was able to establish a psychic link with Rahne when the latter was in wolf or wolfoid form. Rahne's strict religious upbringing often made her uncomfortable when dealing with mythological entities, her sorceress teammate Magik, or demons, as well as making her uncomfortable almost to the point of self-loathing with her superhuman power, which resembles the transformations of a werewolf. The clash between the intense joy of using her powers and the conflicting emotions was causing her inner turmoil. She was disturbed to find herself attracted to Hrimhari, a shapeshifting wolf prince, while in Asgard, and although he became her first serious love, she decided to return to Earth.

Rahne eventually began a relationship with teammate Cypher, and was devastated when he was killed by the Ani-Mator. On one of her two visits to Asgard, she met the demonic Garmr, a gigantic wolf who guards the entrance to the netherworld. She confesses to Rictor that Garm's face, 'that devil's face', is what she sometimes perceives when looking into the mirror. Later, she begins an innocent romance with Rictor, but this proves to be short-lived.

X-Factor
During the 1990 "X-Tinction Agenda" storyline, Rahne is mentally bonded to Havok against her will by the scientists who genetically engineer mutant slaves in the nation of Genosha. She is subsequently manipulated by the Shadow King, into joining X-Factor as a United States government special operative. Her bond with Havok causes her to act irrationally, sometimes threatening teammates, sometimes by flirting with them. She stays in half-wolf forms for this time because turning completely human causes her to revert to the slave identity that the Genoshans had created for her. She makes more than one attempt to undo the bonding, with varying results. Her instability also manifests in many odd dreams, in which her identity is merged with pop culture figures. The Genoshan damage is eventually undone by Haven.

Wolfsbane appears in the 1992 miniseries The Infinity War and its 1993 sequel, The Infinity Crusade. During the first storyline, she is part of the rear guard who stayed behind on Earth at the Fantastic Four headquarters. Various evil doubles attack the building and the assembled heroes. During Crusade, Wolfsbane's deep religious beliefs lead her to be approached by the main villain, the Goddess. Wolfsbane, along with many other religious heroes, is brainwashed as part of the Goddess' army but Wolfsbane's identity is restored by the storyline's conclusion.

Excalibur
Sometime after her mental damage from the Genoshan bonding process was undone, she returned to MacTaggert's base on Muir Island and joined Excalibur. She matures much in her tenure in the book. She develops deep friendships with her allies, including Peter Rasputin and Kitty Pryde. She is depicted as having overcome much of her previous shyness, not caring if the general public of a small town saw her in a revealing uniform.  Rahne also was a bridesmaid in the wedding of Captain Britain and Meggan. Following the disbanding of Excalibur, she and teammate Douglock stayed on Muir Island to assist Moira in her search for a cure for the Legacy Virus. Rahne appears in many issues of the short-lived comic book series Warlock, which starred Douglock. She helps him and others confront various threats revolving around Douglock's assimilation powers. She assists the Avengers in confronting one of the larger threats that nearly overwhelm the city of New York. The island comes under attack by the Brotherhood, resulting in Moira's death, the destruction of the island, and the suppression of Rahne's mutant powers when Mystique shoots her with a version of Forge's Neutralizer.

Xavier Institute

Rahne spends some time motorcycling across the United States following the loss of her powers, having developed a new, less introverted persona. This involves the growing out of her hair from its normal short buzz-cut and the loss of her Scottish burr. Upon her return to New York, she single-handedly defeats the rampaging X-Man villain Avalanche. She becomes both a teaching assistant at the Xavier Institute and a part-time employee of Jamie Madrox's detective agency, X-Factor Investigations.

Prior to her joining the Institute faculty, Rahne becomes involved in a relationship with Elixir. A passionate encounter between the two causes Elixir's mutant healing abilities to restore Rahne's powers; however, Rahne's reversion to her wolf form prompts a tragic moment of savagery that left Elixir seriously wounded. Elixir is able to heal himself, and Rahne is brought back to her senses by an encounter with Danielle Moonstar on the darkened streets of Salem Center. Rahne opts to end the relationship when she is hired as a teacher for the institute.  Though Rahne is initially resistant to continuing the relationship, the two began seeing one another secretly until Rahne ended it upon learning that Elixir's classmate Wallflower is interested in him. Rahne's ending of the relationship is overheard by Wither, and he later releases the information to the whole school in an attempt to end Elixir's budding relationship with Wallflower. In the wake of this, Rahne resigns from the school, and her formerly close friendship with Dani Moonstar, Elixir's legal guardian, becomes strained.

X-Factor Investigations
Rahne begins working full-time for X-Factor, reuniting her with a former love interest and New Mutants teammate Rictor, now depowered. Many aspects of her previous persona return, including her close-cropped hairstyle and Scottish accent. She attends church meetings each week and her devout Presbyterian religiosity remains a central aspect of her character.  She is instrumental in stopping a riot in what was known as 'Mutant Town', a section of New York once dominated by mutants. She threatens to kill anyone who attacks it. Threats were then made against the police who objected to her actions.

She helps rescue new teammate Layla Miller from the orphanage where (X-Factor has been led to believe) she was being abused. Rahne is later distressed by a vision, implanted by Tryp, of a possible future where she murders Jamie Madrox and a grown-up Layla Miller on their wedding day. She has told X-Factor psychiatrist Doc Samson that she has even considered killing herself to prevent it from happening but "Suicides go to hell... but so do murderers. So, I'm damned if I do and damned if I don't."

Rahne gets herself together. She is seen helping her friend Guido Carosella confront personal problems of his own that have arisen from confrontations with the evil Damian Tryp.

Later in the series, Rahne attempts to comfort Rictor, who is distressed about the loss of his powers again, which results in a burgeoning romance between the two, this concludes when she leaves X-Factor to join X-Force.

It is later implied that Emma Frost has blackmailed Rahne with her previous relationship with Elixir into keeping an eye on Wither.

"Messiah Complex"
During the 2007–2008 "Messiah Complex" storyline, Rahne helps Rictor infiltrate the Purifiers; she fakes being shot by Rictor. She is also a member of the new X-Force. During a battle against Lady Deathstrike and the Reavers, Rahne learns that Father Craig was in league with the Purifiers, supposedly divulging enough information about her that the Purifiers can claim to "know her well." She travels with X-Force to her former home Muir Island, now the base of the Marauders. During the climactic battle, Rahne is injured by Riptide, but her wounds, according to Professor X, are superficial and she will recover.

X-Force
When Cyclops decides to reform X-Force after the events of "Messiah Complex", he brings Rahne along to meet with Wolverine. She determinedly accompanies him on the assault on the Purifiers' base, only to be captured by Matthew Risman who shoots her in the knee when X-23 makes a move against him. While her teammates make an attempt to rescue her, they fail and Rahne is taken to an undisclosed Purifier base where she finds out that Reverend Craig has joined the ranks of the Purifiers.

The rest of the X-Force manage to rescue her but discover that she has been injected with a near-lethal dose of heroin. She is immediately taken to Angel's mansion to be healed by Elixir. However, after she wakes up, she immediately attacks Worthington, rips out his wings, and takes them to Reverend Craig.

Josh's name is the second word Rahne says as she awakens from her brainwashed state and finds herself in a dark room somewhere in the facility. She realizes that she can't use her powers thanks to the handcuffs she is wearing. She then remembers being brainwashed by Reverend Craig. After Reverend Craig tries to kill her, she escapes, but not before admitting that the only thing she wanted was her father's love.

Rahne regroups with her teammates, and they begin their assault against Bastion, the Choir, and the Purifiers. As everyone is distracted in the bloody battle, Rahne is shot by her father who follows her blood trail into the room where Angel's severed wings are held. Reverend Craig condemns Wolfsbane again, which triggers her to knock him into the ground, stating that she only wanted to save him but after everything that's happened, she doesn't care for him any longer and walks away, turning her back on him. Craig screams and prepares to shoot his daughter in the back and as he moves, Rahne turns and sees Angel's wings behind her father, giving him the appearance of an angel. Her brainwashing kicks in once again as she mutters "kill the angel" and she enters a feral state, attacking her father. Her teammates find her at the epilogue of the battle in her human form, praying and surrounded by blood and clothes, but no corpse of her father is found. Her teammates hope that she will never recall the memory of apparently devouring her father which would only trigger a deeper psychological shock.

Following the death of Risman, the team reconvenes at Angel's Aerie to recuperate and plan their next move. Rahne's sleeper programming is still active, and she violently charges Angel when she sees him, provoking him to transform into Archangel in retaliation. X-23 calls in the Stepford Cuckoos to help undo the damage done to Wolfsbane, prevent her from attacking her teammates, and overcome the guilt of her actions.

Before they can erase her memories, they are interrupted, and X-Force is sent on a mission, leaving Rahne alone. While alone, she notices someone outside; after running away, it is revealed to be Hrimhari, the Wolf Prince from Asgard. Since then the Cuckoos began searching for her but Cerebra could not detect her, mainly because she was in her wolf form. She was at Angel's Aerie with Hrimhari, still conflicted over her experience with the Purifiers. Hrimhari states that the gods of Asgard have reunited them for a reason and if they can forgive her, then she can do the same for herself. After having sex, the two were attacked by a trio of Frost Giants. Hrimhari wanted to fight them off alone, but Rahne refused to leave him and stated that she was no longer afraid of what she is. The two managed to defeat the Frost Giants and although seemingly unharmed, Rahne fainted right afterwards.

Secret Invasion
Rahne is among the several X-Men helping to fight off Skrulls during their invasion of San Francisco; X-Force were tasked with capturing one of the new Super Skrulls, so Beast could study it to find a weakness.

Necrosha
After Rahne fell unconscious, she was brought to Utopia. There it has been revealed by Dr. Nemesis that she is pregnant with the Wolf Prince's child (a child, according to him, that is neither human nor mutant) and the unborn child is threatening her health and her life. The Wolf Prince later made a deal with the Asgardian goddess of the Underworld, Hela. He gave his soul to Hela in exchange that she restore Elixir to life (after she refused to save Rahne and the baby); she promptly did so and they returned to the Asgardian Underworld together, the Wolf Prince's final words being that he would somehow find his way back to Rahne and their unborn child. Elixir then healed Rahne and stated to her that the genetics of the baby are similar to humans but stronger. He further transferred some of the fetus' strength to Rahne so that she would survive the birth of the baby. While on Genosha, he further stated that he believed that her baby will be very strong and that not even a bullet could pierce her skin now, due to her now-different skin and muscle density. Later on, Rahne further demonstrated enhanced strength and senses.

Return to X-Factor Investigations
The character returns on the last panel of X-Factor #207, obviously pregnant, and walks in on Rictor and Shatterstar in an intimate embrace. In issue #208, she is flabbergasted at first of Rictor being with Shatterstar (just as Rictor is about her being pregnant). After a short moment of confusion, she attacks Shatterstar and throws him through the window, landing on the streets where she claims that Shatterstar must be mind-controlling Rictor. After both are stopped by Longshot, Rictor tells her that he is not mind-controlled, to which she asks how he could be with Shatterstar when he was with her before. Rictor answers that it is complicated and demands that Wolfsbane tell him whether he is the father of her child. After hesitating to answer and after another demand from Rictor and looking at Shatterstar, Rahne states that she was not with anyone but him seven months before and then throws herself into the arms of a bewildered Rictor. After Madrox asked about whether she wants to cover her body while still in bed, she stated that she will do it to protect his sensibilities and that she has been running around naked so often lately that she had lost her blushes. Later on, when Rictor (believing himself to be the father) accompanied Rahne to a physician specialized in 'super-types', it was revealed that although the heartbeat could clearly be heard, the ultrasound examination did not show any picture on the screen. The physician, who at first had trouble believing Rictor to be the father, stated that not even ultrasound can get into Rahne's womb and that this seemed to be a kind of protective function, a mystical one rather than biological. Shatterstar, simultaneously, made the discovery that Hrimhari was the child's father. By this time, Rictor had already figured out that he was not the father due to the child's mystical nature. Layla Miller stated that Rahne had not lied to anybody and after Rictor found her again, Rahne revealed that her pregnancy happened a lot faster than a human one due to Hrimhari's and her lupine nature. She also stated that she was still worried that Rictor 'became' gay because she left him and that she wanted to bring him back to 'her team' because she believes that gay people go to Hell, although she does not want that to be true. Rictor reassured her of their friendship and the two reconciled.

Later, as she left the office to go to church, she ran into Shatterstar, who wanted to mark his territory over Rictor and make peace with her. At the church, they encountered a powerful Sin-Eater demon seeking Rahne's child; it fled after a battle, shortly before Feral—previously deceased—announced herself to the pair. Feral is revealed to have arrived as a tether to the world of the living for various canine and feline gods and demons which want Rahne's baby; as more powerful assailants pour in, the pair attempt to regroup at X-Factor headquarters. Rahne gives birth to the baby through her mouth as opposed to the normal birth procedure. The newborn jumps up and attacks Agamemnon with rage and bloodlust. Rahne is completely freaked out and denounces her newborn son. Rahne says to herself that this was her punishments for the sins she committed while being on X-Force. Jack Russell adopts her son and cares for him. Rahne feels terrible remorse for abandoning her child to the point she tries to eat ice cream to the point of throwing up.

Rahne is guilt-ridden following her abandonment of her son, and comes to fear that her soul will go to Hell. Terry and Lorna take Rahne on a road trip to Vermont, where they meet Father John Madrox, a dupe of Madrox who has become a priest. Rahne reveals to Father John her repressed memories of being on X-Force and was brainwashed into eating her own father. Though shocked, Father John counsels her to let go of her self-pity and judgmental attitude, in lieu of a more positive outlook, which prompts Rahne to resolve to search for her son. Rahne, Rictor and Shatterstar find her son, Tier, and decide to leave X-Factor Investigations to live safely with him and Jack Russell, Werewolf by Night.

Shortly after, the "Hell on Earth War" storyline brings both Tier and Rahne away from Jack Russell and again involved with X-Factor, with Tier as the focal point of a competition for power among six Hell Lords: Mephisto, Asmodeus, Satannish, Satana, Pluto, and Hela. Tier dies by the conflict's conclusion, while Rahne is stranded in the Arctic wilderness but eventually rescued. When last seen, Rahne has agreed to train for a role of deaconess in John Madrox's church.

Secret Empire
When Hydra takes over the United States and displaces mutants to New Tian, Rahne joins a strike force assembled by the New Tian government. It is also revealed that she underwent a secondary mutation that allows her to split into five smaller wolves.

New Mutants: Dead Souls
Rahne joins Magik's team of New Mutants. She also forgives Strong Guy, who also joins the team, for killing her son. She is later infected by the Transmode Virus and manipulated by an insane Karma.

Last X-Men and Death
Rahne and the other New Mutants are taken prisoners by O*N*E. She and Magik are able to resist the Transmode Virus' effects, which she theorizes that it may be because of their shapeshifting abilities. She joins Cyclops's team of X-Men. Eventually, she realizes that she doesn't want to act like a monster anymore and quits the team. However, not long after, she is approached by some young men who realize that she is a mutant and beat her to death. She is mourned by her teammates.

Dawn of X
Rahne is resurrected on Krakoa by The Five and rejoins the New Mutants. After going on several missions with the team, bringing more Mutants to the island, training the islands youth at the Akadamos Habitat and getting help for her trauma with Dani. She began wondering why her son Tier had not been revived yet, but when she asked The Five about it they told her Cerebro was still picking up copies for him implying he's still alive. Upon being told they wouldn't resurrected Tier without proof of Death, she went back to Dani to cry.

The Shadow King later took advantage of her greif to get close to her and then controlled her, using her to bring her student Gabrielle Kinney Scout to him so he could kill her to stop her from interfering with his mentorship of her friends. The next day she saw No-Girl trying to control The Five into resurrecting Gabby and after revealing she had no memory of the conversation they'd recently had, realised the Shadow King manipulated her.

After getting Gabby revived, Rahne and the New Mutants went to confront the Shadow King who trapped them in the Astral Plane, after being rescued by their protégé's The Lost Club. They were able to find the consciousnesses of the real Amahl Ferouk, and free him from the malevolent entity that had been controlling him since childhood.

Powers and abilities

Wolfsbane is a mutant with the ability to transform herself into a wolf at will, while retaining her human intelligence, or into a transitional form which combines human and lupine aspects. While this ability is lycanthropy, it is not magical in nature, but instead a complex biological function involving the mutant X-gene. She can change into a humanoid lupine form resembling a werewolf, or become an actual wolf. In either form, Wolfsbane has enhanced senses of hearing, sight, and smell (similar to those of a wolf's, but also superior to them); animal-like strength, agility, and reflexes; razor-sharp talons and fangs; and bestial instincts. In lupine form she can also see into the infrared and ultraviolet portions of the electromagnetic spectrum, thereby enabling her to perceive heat patterns and to see in the dark. In her lupine form she can also hear sounds and detect scents outside the normal human range. In her transitional form she is less agile than she is as a wolf, but stronger than she is in human form. In her transitional form she can speak, use her forepaws as hands and easily stand erect, and at least some of her senses remain superhumanly acute. Danielle Moonstar's former telepathic talent, which enabled her to communicate with animals, allowed her to communicate with Wolfsbane to a limited degree when she was in her lupine form or "transitional" humanoid-wolf form; in lupine form Wolfsbane may have more difficulty understanding complex human concepts. Rahne later learned to enter different transitional forms which vary slightly in appearance. In her "absolute" lupine form, she possesses superhuman strength and durability.  She possesses regenerative abilities which allow her to recover from injuries in a few days which would incapacitate a normal human for weeks or months.

Wolfsbane's human form is normal in appearance, originally with the exception that her hair never grew more than a few centimeters long; this limitation has since been removed by a temporary biological change into a "mutate" by the Genengineer on the island of Genosha during the X-Tinction Agenda storyline. The artificial mutation process Wolfsbane underwent caused her to act with animalistic savagery in her lupine and "absolute" forms. Rahne was shown to exhibit her keen sense of smell while in human form, sensing traces of blood and spittle on teammate Strong Guy's hand, (identifying who the fluids belonged to) despite him having already wiped it clean. This was followed by Siryn's sonic-scream, leaving Wolfsbane's "doggy-ears...ringing for a week" implying her hearing is also enhanced in human form.  Rahne mentions to Rictor that she indeed has her wolf senses in her human form but changed the subject before explaining further.

While a member of the second X-Factor team, Rahne wears a special uniform made of "unstable molecules" that converts to a collar in her non-human forms.

After her teammate Elixir alters her DNA to match that of her unborn child's strength, Rahne demonstrates greatly increased superhuman strength. Elixir also believes her skin to have become bulletproof, which she later corroborates. Her senses are further heightened to the point that she is able to smell a missing teammate nearly a mile away and underground. After giving birth to her child, these extra abilities fade, and she returns to her original levels of strength and durability.

Reception
 In 2014, Entertainment Weekly ranked Wolfsbane 50th in their "Let's rank every X-Man ever" list.
 In 2018, CBR.com ranked Wolfsbane 18th in their "20 Most Powerful Mutants From The '80s" list.
 In 2018, CBR.com ranked Wolfsbane 17th in their "X-Force: 20 Powerful Members" list.

Other versions

Age of Apocalypse
In the alternate timeline of the 1995–1996 "Age of Apocalypse" storyline, Rahne finds herself stuck in her lupine form and is a companion to the Dark Beast. When this reality was revisited ten years later in X-Men: Age of Apocalypse, Rahne has been rescued and has begun to rediscover of her humanity again. She is now capable of shifting into her hybrid form but is still very feral in her mindset.

Age of X
In the alternate reality seen in the 2011 "Age of X" storyline, Wolfsbane is briefly sheltered from the government by the Fantastic Four, but her presence is betrayed by the Invisible Woman after she accidentally attacks Franklin Richards, resulting in all of the team but Invisible Woman being arrested.

Days of Future Past
An alternate future version of Rahne from the timeline originated by the 1981 "Days of Future Past" storyline appears in Excalibur #94. She spends much of her time viewing recorded images of death and destruction. She, along with a few surviving friends, participates in a raid on a Black Air facility.

Mutant X
In the alternate reality of the 1998–2001 series Mutant X, Rahne works alongside many of her New Mutant counterparts, making a living as thieves, living in the sewers and calling themselves "Marauders." She and her friends barely survive a mission in which they steal container that unbeknownst to them, contains Dracula.

Mys-Tech Wars
An alternate universe version of Rahne, along with alternates of her X-Factor teammates, appears in issue #3 of Mys-Tech Wars to fight alongside the Earth-616 heroes. She does not survive through the violence that follows.

Ultimate Marvel
The Ultimate Marvel version of Wolfsbane makes cameo appearances in Ultimate X-Men. She is seen on a viewscreen in her human form and receives passing mention in Ultimate X-Men #43, during the selection process for Emma Frost's Academy of Tomorrow, in which the President of the United States says "No to the wolf girl." In issue #50, she is seen in her hybrid form at a Coney Island freak show. In issue #95 however, it is revealed that the Ultimate Alpha Flight member Sasquatch (who first appeared in issue #94) is in fact Rahne Sinclair, making it her first official named appearance. She and the rest of her team use a power enhancing drug known as Banshee, the Ultimate version of Mutant Growth Hormone, which can induce a secondary mutation, or further an existing mutation, for example turning Angel into a large anthropomorphic eagle. While using the drug, Rahne can still revert to a more human appearance that resembles a Sasquatch. Later in the same issue, she is injured by Nightcrawler, who, while trying to teleport her away, severs half of her right arm.

What If
Rahne appears in some What If? stories:

 In "What If the X-Men Died on their First Mission?" Yet a preteen in this incarnation, she joins Moira McTaggert on a journey to look after Moira's old lover, Charles Xavier, following another severe punishment at the hands of Reverend Craig. Meeting Hank McCoy, they learn from him about the X-Men's secret and their deaths on Krakoa, during the events of the 1975 book Giant-Size X-Men #1. They remain at the Xavier institute to look after the Professor, who has grown despondent over the loss of his students. When Count Nefaria and his Ani-Men later attempt to blackmail the United States government, Beast hastily assembles a mutant hero team to engage them, but Rahne is accidentally taken along as well. When Beast's team is brought into dire straits by the Ani-Men, Xavier telepathically awakens Rahne's latent shapechanging potential, which allows her to rescue her friends. Afterwards, Rahne joins the newly formed X-Men as a "charter member", although she is last seen wearing her own personal costume.
 In "What if Some of the X-Men Had Stayed in Asgard?", Wolfsbane's actions diverge from those she committed at the end of The Uncanny X-Men Annual #9 (1985), deciding that she cannot be separated from Hrimhari. Although Hrimhari later dies in battle, he leaves her with three children (depicted as a wolf cub, a human baby and a wolf-human hybrid baby) and the rulership over his wolf people.

Wolverine: Rahne of Terra
An alternate reality version of Rahne, named Princess Rain, appeared prominently in the 1991 graphic novel Wolverine: Rahne of Terra. Wolfsbane was transported to the magic-based world of Gesham by the "Mage" (Cable's counterpart) in exchange for the Princess Rain, her own counterpart, and brainwashed to make her believe herself to be Rain. This was done in an attempt to save the Princess from a prophecy which apparently said the Princess would die on her sixteenth birthday. Wolverine was taken there by the wizard Magnus (Gesham's version of Magneto), who Magnus attempted to mind-control in an attempt to fulfill the prophecy. While there, Rahne encountered counterparts of most of the New Mutants, hallucinating that they were the versions she knew, and gradually remembering who she actually was. Meanwhile, Wolverine killed Magnus at the climax before they both return home.

In the 1995 sequel, Wolverine: Knight of Terra, Wolfsbane and Wolverine helped Queen Rain accept the "Beast" which gave her shapeshifting powers, as she was the only one who could control it (since she had rejected it, it had possessed someone else, transforming them into a version of Sabretooth). In this volume, the Queen's associates were counterparts to the X-Men, with the role of the Mage being taken by Professor X's counterpart, the Shaman.

X-Men: The End
In the alternate future of the 2004-2006 X-Men: The End storyline, Wolfsbane is one of the staff at the X-Mansion. She makes brief telepathic contact with the long-lost Danielle. When Skrulls impersonating old X-Men enemies attack the mansion, Wolfsbane sacrifices herself to save many of the surviving children.

In other media

Television
 Wolfsbane appears in the X-Men: The Animated Series episode "Cold Comfort" as a member of X-Factor.
 Wolfsbane appears in X-Men: Evolution, voiced by Chantal Strand. This version is a member of the X-Men's junior team, the New Mutants, who lives at the Xavier Institute and displays a close bond with Sunspot. Later in the series, she is forced to leave the institute after the world discovers the existence of mutants, though she eventually rejoins the New Mutants in a flash-forward depicted in the series finale.
 Wolfsbane makes non-speaking cameo appearances in Wolverine and the X-Men.

Film
Rahne Sinclair / Wolfsbane appears in The New Mutants, portrayed by Maisie Williams while her wolf form is portrayed by trained wolf Chuck. This version enters a relationship with Danielle Moonstar over the course of the film.

Video games
Wolfsbane appears as a playable character in Marvel Puzzle Quest.

Miscellaneous
 Wolfsbane is discussed in the nonfiction book The Great Women Superheroes.
 Wolfsbane appears in the Wolverine versus Sabretooth motion comics, voiced by Kathleen Barr.

References

External links
 Wolfsbane at Marvel.com
 Rahne Sinclair Blog
 
 UncannyXmen.net Spotlight on Wolfsbane
 Marvel Database at Marvel.fandom.com

Characters created by Bob McLeod
Characters created by Chris Claremont
Comics characters introduced in 1982
Excalibur (comics)
Fictional characters with superhuman senses
Fictional immigrants to the United States
Fictional private investigators
Fictional Scottish people
Fictional werewolves
Marvel Comics characters who are shapeshifters
Marvel Comics characters with accelerated healing
Marvel Comics characters with superhuman strength
Marvel Comics female superheroes
Marvel Comics mutants
New Mutants
Superhero schoolteachers
Superheroes who are adopted
X-Factor (comics)